Dikoleps umbilicostriata is a minute species of sea snail, a marine gastropod mollusk in the family Skeneidae.

Description
The height of the shell attains 0.9 mm.

Distribution
This species occurs in the Alboran Sea and in the Western Mediterranean Sea.

References

 Gaglini A., 1987: Spigolature monterosatiane; Notiziario del C.I.S.MA. 9 (10): 3–15
 Gofas, S.; Le Renard, J.; Bouchet, P. (2001). Mollusca, in: Costello, M.J. et al. (Ed.) (2001). European register of marine species: a check-list of the marine species in Europe and a bibliography of guides to their identification. Collection Patrimoines Naturels, 50: pp. 180–213

External links
 

umbilicostriata
Gastropods described in 1987